The flag of Pichilemu consists of a white background with the coat of arms of Pichilemu in the centre. The flag's ratio is 2:3.

See also

Coat of arms of Pichilemu

External links 
 Official website of Pichilemu 

Flag
Flags of Chile
Pichilemu